Released is the second studio album by British band Jade Warrior. It follows a progressive rock trend rather than the ultimately ethnic and worldly sound of their previous album.

From the "Jade Warriors" web site:

Track listing
All tracks written by Tony Duhig, Jon Field, and Glyn Havard.

 "Three-Horned Dragon King" - 6:14
 "Eyes on You" - 3:09
 "Bride of Summer" - 3:21
 "Water Curtain Cave" - 6:29
 "Minnamoto's Dream" - 5:22
 "We Have Reason to Believe" - 3:50
 "Barazinbar" - 14:47
 "Yellow Eyes" - 2:56

Personnel
 Jon Field - flutes, percussion
 Tony Duhig - guitars
 Glyn Havard - bass, vocals
 Allan Price - drums
 Dave Conners - tenor and alto saxes

References 

1971 albums
Vertigo Records albums
Repertoire Records albums
Jade Warrior (band) albums